David McDonald was a member of the Wisconsin State Assembly during the 1848 session. McDonald represented the 1st District of Racine County, Wisconsin. He was a Democrat.

References

Politicians from Racine, Wisconsin
Year of birth missing
Year of death missing
Democratic Party members of the Wisconsin State Assembly